During the 1998–99 FC Barcelona season, the club once again retained the La Liga title, but eliminated by Valencia in the quarter-final of Copa del Rey. Barcelona enjoyed a great season with their new signings Ronald de Boer, Patrick Kluivert, Frank de Boer, Mauricio Pellegrino, Boudewijn Zenden and Phillip Cocu. Barcelona had a league tough start in early season but Barcelona later made a remarkable turnaround to secure La Liga in late-May, thanks to Real Madrid's several slips. Following another lackluster performance in the First Group Phase against two European giants Bayern Munich and Manchester United with wins, draws and losses twice respectively and thus prevented Barcelona qualified to UEFA Champions League quarter finals.

Squad
Squad at end of season

Transfers

In
  Patrick Kluivert –  Milan, 28 August, £8,750,000
  Mauricio Pellegrino –  Vélez Sarsfield
  Phillip Cocu –  PSV
  Boudewijn Zenden –  PSV
Winter
  Ronald de Boer –  Ajax, £22,000,000 (joint fee with Frank de Boer)
  Frank de Boer –  Ajax, joint fee

Out
  Fernando Couto –  Lazio
  Iván de la Peña –  Lazio
  Albert Ferrer –  Chelsea F.C.
  Hristo Stoichkov –  CSKA Sofia
  Guillermo Amor –  Fiorentina
 Amor joined Fiorentina on July 1 after he was granted the freedom letter by Barcelona.
  Juan Antonio Pizzi –  River Plate
 Barcelona accepted a 350 million pesetas transfer for Pizzi, which was signed on July 1. The contract included a compensation fee if River Plate was to sell the player to a European team during its three-year duration.
  Carles Busquets –  Lleida
  Christophe Dugarry –  Olympique de Marseille
  Toni Velamazán –  CF Extremadura
 Velamazán's move to Extremadura was decided after the player met youth football director Lorenzo Serra Ferrer on June 30. Barcelona kept a two-year repurchase option.

Antinio Flores Aragon

Winter
  Vítor Baía – Porto, loan-out

Competitions

La Liga

League table

Results by round

Matches

UEFA Champions League

Group D

Copa del Rey

Eightfinals

Quarterfinals

Results

Statistics

Players statistics

References

External links
 1998–99 Results and Statistics
 FC Barcelona Official Site
 FCBarcelonaweb.co.uk English Speaking FC Barcelona Supporters
 ESPNsoccernet: Barcelona Team Page 
 FC Barcelona (Spain) profile
 uefa.com - UEFA Champions League
 Web Oficial de la Liga de Fútbol Profesional
 FIFA.com
 Federació Catalana de Futbol

FC Barcelona seasons
Barcelona
1998-99